Flosi Ólafsson (27 October 1929 – 24 October 2009) was an Icelandic actor. He appeared in more than twelve films from 1962 to 2011.

Selected filmography

References

External links 

1929 births
2009 deaths
Icelandic male film actors